Cirsa is Spain's largest casino operator as of 2017.

History
Cirsa was founded in 1978 by Manuel Lao Hernández. It is involved in the fabrication and distribution of different types of gambling machines. By 1990 they started to expand their presence outside of Spain. It started with the Dominican Republic, then in 1991 went to Venezuela, and currently over seventy countries around the world. The company generated 349,328,000 million euros of revenue solely in the first quarter of 2018

On the 8th April, 2022, Cirsa announced the organisation had appointed Antonio Hostench as CEO.

Blackstone takeover
In April 2018, it was announced that The Blackstone Group would acquire the company. No further details were released about the deal.

References

Gambling companies
Gambling companies established in 1978
Gambling websites
Gaming websites